Liza Maza (born September 8, 1957) is a Filipina activist who was the lead convenor of the National Anti-Poverty Commission under the Duterte administration from August 2016 until her resignation in August 2018. She was a member of the Philippine House of Representatives, representing the Gabriela Women's Party.

Biography 
Maza got her Bachelor of Science in Business Economics degree from University of the Philippines Diliman in 1978.

Maza has authored 18 bills and 24 resolutions as a Bayan Muna representative to the 12th Congress. As a representative of Gabriela Women's Party, she has authored 53 bills and 120 resolutions at the 13th and 14th Congress. The bills she authored that were passed as laws include the Rent Control Act of 2009 (RA 9653), The Juvenile Justice and Welfare Act of 2006 (RA 9344), Magna Carta of Women (RA 9710), Philippine Nursing Act (RA 9173), Anti-Torture Law (RA 9745) and the Anti-Violence in Women and Children Act (RA 9262), which she co-authored. She also authored Anti-Trafficking in Persons Act of 2003.

On July 8, 2015,  U.S. immigration authorities barred her from entering the U.S. to participate in a left-wing conference on U.S. activities in the Philippines. She has accused the U.S. of supporting human rights violations in the Philippines. She plans to file charges against the U.S. and Korean Airlines, the airline that she was supposed to have taken.

References

External links 
 Official website

1957 births
Members of the House of Representatives of the Philippines for Gabriela Women's Party
Members of the House of Representatives of the Philippines for Bayan Muna
Duterte administration cabinet members
Filipino activists
Filipino Roman Catholics
Living people
People from San Pablo, Laguna
Socialist feminists
Heads of government agencies of the Philippines
University of the Philippines Diliman alumni
Women members of the Cabinet of the Philippines
Women members of the House of Representatives of the Philippines
21st-century Filipino women politicians
21st-century Filipino politicians